"Something in Common" is a song by American singers Bobby Brown and then-wife Whitney Houston, that was featured on Brown's third album, Bobby (1992). The single version was re-recorded and released in December 1993, and was also available on Brown's 1993 compilation album Remixes in the Key of B. It stands as the couple's first musical collaboration and the only one released as a single. The song examines two unlikely people coming together as they find "something in common."

Chart performance
The song was released as a single track in the United Kingdom, where it peaked at number 16. Although the song and its music video received moderate rotation in the United States, "Something in Common" was not released as a commercial single and was ineligible to chart on the Billboard Hot 100 and Hot R&B Singles charts; however, it peaked at numbers 32 and 30 on the Hot 100 Airplay and Hot R&B Airplay lists, respectively.

Critical reception
Larry Flick from Billboard felt the song is "actually quite sweet, and good fun ... not to mention a viable radio contender." Troy J. Augusto from Cashbox named it Pick of the Week, declaring it as "quite a catchy number thanks to the always reliable production skills of Teddy Riley as well as LA. Reid's remix and the duo's pleasant delivery." He also called it a "happy, positive cut". David Browne from Entertainment Weekly noted that here, Brown "coos to his new bride, Whitney Houston, in a bouncy duet". Pan-European magazine Music & Media commented, ""My Maaaaaan," Whitney sings proudly on a thundering swingbeat. "Giiiiiiiirl", Bobby replies passionately, and together they sing about their much-publicised happy marriage. Baby "Bobbie" joins in on the video only." 

Alan Jones from Music Week wrote, "This shuffling jackswing/soul number draws fine vocal performances from the husband and wife team and is the commercial highlight of Brown's album." The Network Forty declared it "a wonderful uptempo track", adding that "the electric vocals of Houston and Brown gives an urban edge to their strong dance and pop base." A reviewer from People Magazine felt it is "destined to be a much scrutinized cut", describing it as an "up-from-the-streets echo" of Steve Lawrence and Eydie Gorme. In an retrospective review, Pop Rescue complimented Houston's vocals as "rich and confident". James Hamilton from the RM Dance Update viewed it as "pleasant". Mark Frith from Smash Hits gave the song two out of five.

Music video

The official music video for the song was directed by British commercial, film and music video director Andy Morahan.

Track listing
 "Something in Common" (Radio edit) - 4:25
 "Something in Common" (Original album version) – 4:59
 "Something in Common" (Extended vocal version) – 6:55
 "Something in Common" (Quiet Storm version) – 4:38
 "Something in Common" (Dub version) – 6:28
 "Something in Common" (LA Reid Remix) – 6:46
 "Something in Common" (Second LA Reid Remix) – 7:00

Credits
 Executive Producer – Bobby Brown, Louil Silas Jr., Tommy Brown
 Piano – Bo Watson
 Producer – Teddy Riley
 Remix – L.A. Reid

Charts

Release history

References

External links
 "Something in Common", Maxi-single CD promo
 Something in Common at Discogs

1992 songs
1993 singles
Bobby Brown songs
Whitney Houston songs
MCA Records singles
Music videos directed by Andy Morahan
Song recordings produced by Teddy Riley
Songs written by Bernard Belle
Songs written by Teddy Riley
Songs written by Whitney Houston
Songs written by Bobby Brown